Charles Oberthür (born as Carl Oberthür) (4 March 1819 – 8 November 1895) was a German harpist and composer active in Germany, Switzerland and England.

Biography
The son of a violin maker, Oberthür was born in Munich and studied the harp there with Elisa Brauchle and composition with Georg Valentin Röder (1776–1848), music director at the Bavarian court. He was successively employed at theatres in Zürich (1837), Wiesbaden (1839), and Mannheim (1842), before he settled in London in 1844, initially as harpist at the Royal Italian Opera House. In 1861, he became the first Professor of Harp at the Royal Academy of Music, London. He died in London in 1895.

Oberthür was the composer of over 450 works, most for or including the harp. He also published a useful harp method, his opus 36. His large-scale works have not been performed for many years and included the opera Floris de Namur (performed at Wiesbaden) and the cantatas The Pilgrim Queen, The Red Cross Knight, and Lady Jane Grey. As a harpist, he became "unrivalled as a virtuoso and teacher". A contemporary source described him as "the leading harpist in Britain, and on the Continent he is held in the highest esteem."

Selected compositions
Harp solo
Reminiscences de Suisse, Op. 3
Souvenir de Genève, Op. 4
Fantaisie et variations brillantes sur le Valse du désir, Op. 5
Addio, mia vita, addio! Barcarolle, Op. 25
Souvenir de Londres. Fantaisie et variations brillantes sur un thême original, Op. 26
Bijou de Nabucco. Grande fantaisie sur l'opéra de Verdi, Op. 28
Souvenir de Boulogne. Nocturne, Op. 30
La Belle Emmeline. Impromptu, Op. 51
Trois Mélodies religieuses, Op. 52
The Nun's Prayer. Mélodie religieux, Op. 54
Gems of German Songs. Twelve Recreations, Op. 61
Le Désir, Op. 65
Au bord de la mer. Nocturne, Op. 68
Bel chiaro di luna. Impromptu, Op. 91
Cradle Song (Wiegenlied), Op. 93
Voyage en Suisse. Trois Morceaux originaux, Op. 99
Pensées musicales. Trois Pièces de salon, Op. 110
Stray Leaves. Three Sketches, Op. 114
Fantaisie brillante on Motives of Flotow's Opera 'Martha', introducing 'The Last Rose of Summer', performed by the author before Her Majesty Queen Victoria, Op. 116
Six Sacred Melodies, Op. 127
Gems of Verdi. Twelve operatic airs, Op. 149
La Sylphide. Morceau caractéristique, Op. 150
Seaside Rambles. Four Musical Sketches, Op. 158
Le Réveil des elfes. Morceau caractéristique, Op. 181
A Fairy Legend, Op. 182
Erin, oh! Erin! Mélodie irlandaise favorite, Op. 183
The Harp that once through Tara's Hall. Transcription of a favoured Irish air, Op. 187
Old English Melodies (Englische Melodien aus alter Zeit), Op. 221
Within a mile of Edinbro' Town. Capricio, Op. 285
Conte de fées. Caprice, Op. 301 – see YouTube video of performance
Rêverie. Impromptu, Op. 314
Le Papillon. Caprice, Op. 317 - see YouTube video of a performance

Harp and orchestra
Concertino for harp and orchestra, Op. 175 (c.1863)
Loreley, Op. 180
Orpheus, Op. 253 – see YouTube video of live performance

Orchestra
Rübezahl Ouvertüre, Op. 82 (1867)
Vorspiel zu 'Shakespeare, ein Winternachtstraum, Op. 210 (1885)Chamber music'''Souvenir à Schwalbach, Op. 42 for horn and harpMon séjour à Darmstadt, Op. 90 for horn and harp
Trio, Op. 139 for violin, cello, harp
Trio, Op. 162 for violin, cello, harp (1867)Orpheus, Op. 253 for harp and pianoBerceuse, Op. 299 for violin and harp (1885)Sweet Dreams, Op. 300 for clarinet and piano

Selected recordingsLa Sylphide, Op. 150, performed by Catherine Eisenhoffer, on: Gallo CD-622 (1990)La Sylphide, Op. 150, performed by Marielle Nordmann, on: Erato 2292-45482-2 (1990)Le Réveil des Elfes, Op. 181; A Fairy Legend, Op. 182; Conte de Fées, Op. 301, performed by Elizabeth Jane Baldry, on: Campion Cameo 2025Berceuse, Op. 299 performed by Frances Mason and Jenny Broome, on: Hommage aux Demoiselles Eissler'', MMC Recordings MMC 123 (2018)

References

External links
 Scores by Charles Oberthür from the International Harp Archives on archive.org
 

1819 births
1895 deaths
19th-century classical composers
19th-century German composers
19th-century German male musicians
Academics of the Royal Academy of Music
Composers for harp
German emigrants to England
German harpists
German male classical composers
German Romantic composers
Musicians from Munich